Jera (also Jeran, Jeraz) is the conventional name of the j-rune  of the Elder Futhark, from a reconstructed Common Germanic stem  meaning "harvest, (good) year".

The corresponding letter of the Gothic alphabet is Gothic , named 𐌾𐌴𐍂 (jēr), also expressing /j/.

Name

The reconstructed Common Germanic name  is the origin of English year (Old English ġēar). 
In contrast to the modern word, it had a meaning of "season" and specifically "harvest", and hence "plenty, prosperity".

Elder Futhark
The derivation of the rune is uncertain; some scholars see it as a modification of Latin G ("C (ᚲ) with stroke") while others consider it a Germanic innovation. The letter in any case appears from the very earliest runic inscriptions, figuring on the Vimose comb inscription, harja.

As the only rune of the Elder Futhark which was not connected, its evolution  was the most thorough transformation of all runes, and it was to have numerous graphical variants.
In the later period of the Elder Futhark, during the 5th to 6th centuries, connected variants appear, and these are the ones that give rise to the  derivations in Anglo-Saxon (as ᛄ ger and ᛡ ior) and Scandinavian (as ᛅ ár) traditions.

Gothic jer
The corresponding Gothic letter is 𐌾 (j), named jēr, which is also based on the shape of the Elder Futhark rune. This is an exception, shared with urus, due to the fact that neither the Latin nor the Greek alphabets at the time of the introduction of the Gothic one had graphemes corresponding to the distinction of j and w from i and u.

Anglo-Saxon runes
The rune in the futhorc is continued as gēr, with its epigraphical variant , and its manuscript variant  (which does appear at least once epigraphically, on the Brandon Pin).

Younger Futhark 

During the 6th and 7th centuries, the initial j in *jāra was lost in Proto-Norse, which also changed the sound value of the rune from /j/ to an /a/ phoneme. 
The rune was then written as a vertical staff with a horizontal stroke in the centre, usually transliterated as A, with majuscule, to distinguish it from the ansuz rune, a.

During the last phase of the Elder Futhark, the jēra-rune came to be written as a vertical staff with two slanting strokes in the form of an X in its centre. As the form of the rune had changed considerably, an older 7th century form of the rune was assumed by the s-rune. When the n-rune had stabilized in its form during the 6th and 7th centuries, its vertical stroke slanted towards the right, which made it possible to simplify the jēra-rune by having only one vertical stroke that slanted towards the left, giving the  ár-rune of the classic Younger Futhark (note however, that the earliest YF inscriptions, such as the Ribe skull fragment, still retain the earlier X-shape).
Since a simpler form of the rune was taken by the /a/ phoneme, the older cross form of the rune now came to be used for the /h/ phoneme.

The development of the Jēran rune from the earliest open form was not known before the discovery of the Kylver Stone in 1903, which has an entire elder futhark inscription on it. Therefore, the interpretation of the golden horns of Gallehus was slightly wrong before 1903, as it was believed this rune form could be an early form of the Ingwaz rune. The second word on the horns was thus interpreted as holtingaz rather than holtijaz.

See also
Elder Futhark
Rune poem

Notes

References

 Enoksen, Lars Magnar (1998). Runor: Historia, Tydning, Tolkning. Historiska Media, Falun. 
 Looijenga, J. H. (1997). Runes around the North Sea and on the Continent AD 150-700, page 76. Dissertation, Groningen University
 Page, Raymond I. (2005). Runes. The British Museum Press 

Runes
Etymologies